Borro (previously known as Borro Private Finance) is a US-based online pawnbroker and secured lender.

Borro may also refer to:
 Alessandro dal Borro (1600–1656), Tuscan nobleman and general
 Girolamo Borro (1512–1592), Italian philosopher
 Jean-Pierre Borro (born 1938), sailor from Monaco

See also
 Boro (disambiguation)
 Borrow (disambiguation)
 Burro, a donkey

Surnames of Italian origin